The Harmattan is a season in West Africa that occurs between the end of November and the middle of March. It is characterized by the dry and dusty northeasterly trade wind, of the same name, which blows from the Sahara over West Africa into the Gulf of Guinea. The name is related to the  word  in the Twi language. The temperature is cold mostly at night in some places, but can be very hot in certain places during daytime, all can also depend on local circumstances.

The Harmattan blows during the dry season, which occurs during the months with the lowest sun.  In this season the subtropical ridge of high pressure stays over the central Sahara and the low-pressure Intertropical Convergence Zone (ITCZ) stays over the Gulf of Guinea. On its passage over the Sahara, the Harmattan picks up fine dust and sand particles (between 0.5 and 10 microns). It is also known as the "doctor wind", because of its invigorating dryness compared with humid tropical air.

Effects
This season differs from winter, because it is characterized by cold, dry, dust-laden wind, and also wide fluctuations in the ambient temperatures of the day and night. It can also be hot in some regions, like in the Sahara.

The air is particularly dry and desiccating when the Harmattan blows over the region. The Harmattan brings desert-like weather conditions: it lowers the humidity, dissipates cloud cover, prevents rainfall formation and sometimes creates big clouds of dust which can result in dust storms or sandstorms. The wind can increase fire risk and cause severe crop damage. The interaction of the Harmattan with monsoon winds can cause tornadoes.

Harmattan haze
In some countries in West Africa, the heavy amount of dust in the air can severely limit visibility and block the sun for several days, comparable to a heavy fog. This effect is known as the Harmattan haze. It costs airlines millions of dollars in cancelled and diverted flights each year. When the haze is weak, the skies are clear. The extreme dryness of the air may cause branches of trees to die.

Health
Humidity drops to as low as 15%, which can result in spontaneous nosebleeds for some people. Other health effects on humans may include conditions of the skin (dryness of the skin), dried or chapped lips, eyes, and respiratory system, including aggravation of asthma.

See also
Khamsin

References

External links

Cold
Geography of Ghana
Geography of Nigeria
Geography of West Africa
Seasons
Winds